Konstantin Nikolayevich Zaytsev (born 16 December 1983) is a Russian professional football coach and a former player. He is an assistant coach with FC Yenisey Krasnoyarsk. He also holds Ukrainian citizenship as Kostyantyn Mykolayovych Zaytsev.

Club career
He played 8 seasons in the Russian Football National League for FC SKA-Energiya Khabarovsk, FC Vityaz Podolsk and FC Mordovia Saransk.

References

External links
 
 

1983 births
Sportspeople from Donetsk
Living people
Russian footballers
Ukrainian footballers
Association football defenders
FC SKA-Khabarovsk players
FC Mordovia Saransk players
FC Tyumen players
FC Vityaz Podolsk players
FC Dynamo Bryansk players
Russian football managers
Ukrainian football managers
Russian expatriate football managers
Ukrainian expatriate football managers